Time Bank Zimbabwe Limited, also referred to as Time Bank Zimbabwe, but commonly known as Time Bank,  is commercial bank in Zimbabwe. It is one of the seventeen licensed commercial banks in the country.

Overview
Time Bank is a small financial services provider in Zimbabwe. , the bank's total asset valuation is not publicly known. The shareholder's equity in the bank is estimated at about US$12.5 million, the minimum capital requirement for a commercial bank in Zimbabwe, effective December 2010. Prior to 2004, the bank was primarily a retail bank. Following its re-opening in 2011, Time Bank will focus on investment banking.

History
The bank was founded prior to 2004. That year, it was closed down by the Reserve Bank of Zimbabwe (RBZ), the national banking regulator. The shareholders and management of the bank appealed that decision and the courts reversed it in 2009. The bank then successfully applied for reinstatement of its banking license. Time bank is scheduled to resume full banking activities in March 2011, with two retail branches in Harare, the capital of Zimbabwe and the country's largest city.

Ownership
The shares of stock of Time Bank are privately owned. Detailed shareholding in the bank is not publicly available.

Branch network
, the bank branches are Main Branch at Burrough House, Harare, and Airport Branch at Harare International Airport, Harare.

See also
 List of banks in Zimbabwe
 Reserve Bank of Zimbabwe
 Economy of Zimbabwe

References

External links
Website of Reserve Bank of Zimbabwe

Banks of Zimbabwe
Companies based in Harare